Ropery Lane is a cricket ground in Chester-le-Street, England round the corner from The Riverside Ground. It is the home of the Chester-le-Street Cricket Club, who play in the North East Premier League.

Prior to Durham County Cricket Club gaining first-class status in 1992, they played six Gillette Cup/Natwest Trophy matches at Ropery Lane, while Minor Counties North also used the ground for a Benson & Hedges Cup game. After Durham became a first-class county, Durham played four 1st XI matches there: one in the County Championship, one in the AXA Equity and Law League and two tour matches against Pakistan and South Africa. The ground has not hosted a 1st XI game since 1994.

The ground has hosted three first-class matches and eight List A matches.

Game information

Game statistics: first-class

Game Statistics: one-day matches:
{| class="wikitable"
|-
! Category
! Information
|-
| Highest Team Score
| Durham (262/7 in 48.1 overs against Nottinghamshire) in 1993
|-
| Lowest Team Score
| Durham (82 in 40.4 overs against Worcestershire) in 1968
|-
| Best Batting Performance
| Wayne Larkins (128 Runs for Durham against Nottinghamshire) in 1993
|-
| Best Bowling Performance
| Simon Davis (7/32 for Durham against Lancashire) in 1983
|}

External links
 Chester-le-Street Cricket Club
 Cricinfo Website - Ground Page
 Cricket Archive page

Cricket grounds in County Durham
Chester-le-Street